Absent Minded may refer to:

Absent Minded (Swedish rapper), released the album Extreme Paranoia in Stocktown 1996
Absent Minded, album by Polish band Mikrokolektyw 2013